Keith Alexander (born January 3, 1963 in New York)  is an American race car driver. He spent three years, starting in 2001, completing half seasons for Porsche-supplied teams in the American Le Mans Series. He has also competed in the GrandAm Series and GrandAm Motorola Cup.

References

External links

Living people
American racing drivers 
Racing drivers from New York City
1963 births